"Hypnotic" is a song recorded by American singer Zella Day for her second extended play, Zella Day (2014), and her second studio album, Kicker (2015). It was released as the latter record's lead single on February 27, 2015, as a digital download through Pinetop and Hollywood Records. Written by Zella Day, Xandy Barry, James Bailey, and Ryan Ogren, "Hypnotic" was produced by the Wax LTD team of Barry and Wally Gagel. Musically an alternative, folk, and pop song, its lyrics deal with the protagonist begging her lover for mutual respect.

The song was regarded by contemporary music critics as a standout. It was also appreciated for bringing the sadcore genre to light. An accompanying music video for "Hypnotic" was issued ten days after its after physical release, and features the singer bathing in a bathtub with a horse, dancing in a room, and driving a car through the desert.

Background and composition 
Following a hiatus after her record label expressed doubts of her being too opinionated for her age, Zella Day joined BMG Rights Management and returned to work with Wax Ltd to begin production on several tracks. Together, they continued creating new music and would eventually write "Hypnotic" along with songwriters James Bailey and Ryan Ogren. With track production handled by the Wax Ltd team, "Hypnotic" was written in coordination by Day, Barry, Bailey, and Ogren. On February 17, 2015, the single was released to the iTunes Store as part of their "Free Singles of the Week" program.

"Hypnotic" is a combination of alternative, folk, and pop genres, and has been celebrated as one of the defining songs of the nascent sadcore subgenre. In its lyrics, Day begs for a lover to feel the same respect for her as she does for him. She sings in the chorus: "You do it to me so well / Hypnotic taking over me / Make me feel like someone else / You got me talking in my sleep," before admitting, "I don't wanna come back down / I don't wanna touch the ground / Pacific Ocean dug so deep / Hypnotic taking over me".

Critical reception 
Ethan Germann from Atwood acclaimed Day's choice of releasing "Hypnotic" as a single, and complimented the soaring chorus and captivating vocals. Emilee Atkinson, a student columnist for Weber State University's The Signpost, singled out the track for bringing a positive light to sadcore music; she claimed: "for listeners who aren't normally fans of this type of music, Zella Day is a good place to start." Jacob Brown from Vogue recognized the song as a "pop gem" and compared its rhythm to that of Christina Aguilera's music and the lyrics to Lana Del Rey's works.

Music video 
An accompanying music video for the single was released on February 27, 2015, through Day's official Vevo account. The visuals were directed by Gianennio Salucci and produced by Rod Hamilton. Day spoke of the symbolism within the plot:
Yeah, but there's a lot of symbolism in that video. The horse represents this pure, unjaded, unfazed love. In the video, we are both, me and my love interest, kind of going through phases of having the horse in our possession. In the beginning of the video, he has the horse, and then I do. It's kind of this fight, it's just a war between us, and Mickey kind of represents what we're trying to win. Then you have the black snake that kind of represents tainted love.

Live performances 

When touring in Minneapolis, Minnesota, the singer performed "Hypnotic" live in Studio C at the KTCZ-FM broadcast hall.

Appearances in media
Hypnotic was featured in several films, television shows, and commercials.
 Pretty Little Liars – "No Stone Unturned" (2015)
 The Royals – "Unmask Her Beauty to the Moon" (2015)
 The Vampire Diaries – "A Bird in a Gilded Cage" (2015)
 Shameless – "I Am A Storm" (2016)

Charts

Certifications

Release history

References 

2014 songs
2015 singles
Hollywood Records singles
Zella Day songs
Songs written by Ryan Ogren